Joe Leandrew McQueen (May 30, 1919 – December 7, 2019), also known as Joe Lee McQueen, was an American jazz saxophonist.

Biography
McQueen was born in Ponder, Texas, and raised in Ardmore, Oklahoma. His father left when he was a young boy and his mother died when he was 14 years old, after which he lived with his grandparents.<ref name=depoopplaying saxophone in part because of his cousin, Herschel Evans, a saxophonist with Count Basie during the 1930s. He developed a relationship with Thelma, whom he met on a dance floor in Ardmore, and they married on June 10, 1944.

McQueen toured with bands throughout the United States. While passing through Ogden, Utah, with his wife Thelma in 1945, the leader of the band McQueen was in at the time took the group's money, later losing it while gambling on the way to Las Vegas.

McQueen and wife Thelma decided to remain in Ogden. He performed with jazz musicians when they stopped in Utah, such as Charlie Parker, Chet Baker, Paul Gonsalves, Lester Young, Count Basie, Duke Ellington, Dizzy Gillespie, Nat King Cole, Louis Armstrong, Cab Calloway, and Ray Charles.

In 1962 he played in Idaho Falls, Idaho, with Hoagy Carmichael.

As he approached the age of 100, he was still performing.

Awards and honors
McQueen was the subject of the documentary film King of O-Town. In 2002, the governor of Utah established April 18 as Joe McQueen Day. In 2019, the Utah legislature honored his 100th birthday.

Health and death
McQueen was diagnosed with throat cancer in 1969 after years of smoking. He underwent surgery and quit playing for several years.

McQueen died on the morning of December 7, 2019, at the age of 100. He was survived by his wife of seventy-five years, Thelma.

References

1919 births
2019 deaths
20th-century American male musicians
20th-century American saxophonists
21st-century American male musicians
21st-century American saxophonists
African-American jazz musicians
African-American centenarians
American centenarians
American jazz saxophonists
American male saxophonists
Jazz musicians from Oklahoma
American male jazz musicians
Musicians from Ogden, Utah
People from Ardmore, Oklahoma
People from Denton County, Texas
Jazz musicians from Texas
Weber State University faculty
Men centenarians
20th-century African-American musicians
21st-century African-American musicians